The  Punta Mirauda is a mountain of the Ligurian Alps located in Piedmont (NW Italy).

Toponymy 
Mirauda is a regional name used in Piedmont for the green whip snake.

Geography  

The mountain stands on the ridge dividing the valleys of Vermenagna and Pesio. Southwards of the summit the water divide lowers with Colla Vaccarile (2.050 m) after which stand the Monte Jurin and the Cima della Fascia. In the opposite direction, after Il Colletto (2.080 m), the ridge goes on with the Bric Costa Rossa and the Bisalta. From the Punta Mirauda starts a third ridge which, heading SW, divides the Vallone Sottana from the Valle Almellina, two tributaries of the main Vermenagna Valley. A last ridge heads E towards the centre of the Pesio valley, linking Punta Mirauda with the Labiaia Mirauda (1.971 m), a mountain that overlooks Pian della Gorre.
The prominence of Punta Mirauda is 77 m, its key col being the Colletto (2.080 m). The summit of the mountain is flanked by a subsummit named Punta Agugion (2.133 m).

SOIUSA classification 
According to the SOIUSA (International Standardized Mountain Subdivision of the Alps) the mountain can be classified in the following way:
 main part = Western Alps
 major sector = South Western Alps
 section = Ligurian Alps
 subsection = It:Alpi del Marguareis/Fr:Alpes Liguriennes Occidentales
 supergroup = It:Catena Marguareis-Mongioie/Fr:Chaîne Marguareis-Mongioie
 group = It:Gruppo Testa Ciaudon-Punta Mirauda
 subgroup = It:Dorsale della Punta Mirauda 
 code = I/A-1.II-B.3.b

Geology 
The mountain stands in a karstic area. A huge network of natural tunnels, which collects underground water reaching the acquifer through many fractures and ponors, takes its name from Punta Mirauda.

Access to the summit 
The Punta Mirauda can be reached from Limone Piemonte (Casali Barat village) with an easy hiking itinerary, or from the Pesio valley, starting in this case from Pian delle Gorre.

The mountain is also a classic, but quite engaging, ski mountaineering destination.

Conservation 
The eastern slopes of the mountain, facing the Pesio Valley, are part of the Natural Park of Marguareis, a nature reserve established by Regione Piemonte.

References

Bibliography 
 Sergio Marazzi, Atlante Orografico delle Alpi. SOIUSA. Pavone Canavese (TO), Priuli & Verlucca editori, 2005.

Maps 
 
 
 

Mountains of the Ligurian Alps
Mountains of Piedmont
Two-thousanders of Italy